The International Accreditation Forum (IAF) Multilateral Recognition Arrangement (MLA) is an agreement for the mutual recognition of accredited certification between IAF Accreditation Body (AB) Member signatories. This agreement allows for the acceptance of accredited certification in many markets based on one accreditation. The worldwide recognition of certificates granted by IAF MLA signatories and their accredited bodies removes technical barriers to trade, reduces costs and adds value to business and customers.  

Admittance to the MLA is granted only after thorough evaluation of an AB's operations by a peer evaluation team that ensures the AB is compliant with both international standards and IAF requirements. IAF Members invest considerable resources into maintaining the integrity of the MLA, thereby retaining the confidence of businesses, specifiers and regulators.

Currently covering the areas of management systems, products, personnel and validation and verification, the IAF MLA is composed of main and sub-scopes as defined in IAF PR 4: Structure of the IAF MLA and List of IAF Endorsed Normative Documents and illustrated in the IAF MLA Status document. Certificates issued on the basis of an IAF MLA main scope are considered equally trustworthy because the certification or validation and verification bodies conform to the same standard, while certificates issued on the basis of a sub-scope are considered equivalent due to being based on the same IAF-endorsed standard or sector scheme.

IAF MLA signatories and their accredited conformity assessment bodies may use the IAF MLA Mark subject to the terms defined in IAF ML 2: General Principles on the Use of the IAF MLA Mark. The MLA Mark provides assurance that the issuing conformity assessment bodies are competent and can be trusted.

It is important to add that not all IAF Members are signatories to the MLA, or that those who are signatories have signed the MLA for all accreditation standards (mainly ISO 17021, ISO/IEC 17024 or ISO 17065). Some IAF members have signed the MLA only for some of the accreditation standards, while others have not signed it at all.

References

External links
 International Accreditation Forum
 IAF MLA Annual Report 2019
 IAF MLA Annual Report 2019 Infographic

Standards